Tetiana Volodymyrivna Voitiuk (born 19 March 1953) is a former ice dancer who competed for the Soviet Union. With her skating partner, Viacheslav Zhigalin, she became the 1970 European bronze medalist and 1972 Soviet national champion.

Results 
(with Zhigalin)

References 

Soviet female ice dancers
Sportspeople from Kropyvnytskyi
1953 births
Living people